Gloucester TMD is a traction maintenance depot located in Gloucester, Gloucestershire, England. The depot is situated on the Great Western Main Line and is on the north side of the line to the east of  Gloucester station.

The depot code is GL.

History
Around 1987, the depot had an allocation of Class 08s and two Class 97 departmental shunters. The depot was also used for stabling Classes 31, 45, 47 and 50 locomotives.

Present 
As of 2016, the depot has no allocation. It is, instead, a stabling point for Great Western Railway Class 150 Sprinters.

References

Bibliography

Rail transport in Gloucestershire
Railway depots in England